The 22nd TVyNovelas Awards, is an Academy of special awards to the best of soap operas and TV shows. The awards ceremony took place on March 3, 2004 in the Mexico D.F. The ceremony was televised in the Mexico by Canal de las estrellas.

Víctor Noriega and Laisha Wilkins hosted the show. Amor real won 9 awards, the most for the evening, including Best Telenovela. Other winners Amarte es mi pecado won 4 awards, Mariana de la noche won 2 awards and Alegrijes y rebujos won 1 award.

Summary of awards and nominations

Winners and nominees

Telenovelas

Others

Special Awards
Career as an Actress: Ofelia Guilmáin
Career as an Actor: Aarón Hernán
30-year Career as an Actress and Singer: Daniela Romo
Best Hostess and a Pioneer in the Internationalization of Telenovelas: Verónica Castro
Special Award as a Writer: María Zarattini for Amor real
Best Comedy Production: La Parodia
Children Time Bar per Production: Rosy Ocampo

References

External links
Images 1 Images 2
Images 3 Images 4
Images 5 Images 6 
Images 7 Winners of 2004 TVyNovelas Awards

TVyNovelas Awards
TVyNovelas Awards
TVyNovelas Awards
TVyNovelas Awards ceremonies